RNDr. Bedřich Pola (also:) (9 November 1963), is a Czech entrepreneur, founder of the first private integrated circuit Development Centre in the Czech and Slovak Federative Republic, Knight of Honour and Devotion of the Sovereign Military Order of Malta (SMOM), President of Maltézská pomoc, o.p.s. (the humanitarian organization established by the  SMOM's Grand Priory of Bohemia) and the owner of castle Bukovec.

Life

Early life, education 
Born in Brandýs nad Labem on 9 November 1963 into an ancient Italian noble family Pola (since 17th century living in Bohemia). He graduated from the Charles University in Prague in Physics. In 1987, he completed postgraduate studies, earning his RNDr. degree in electronics.

Family 
In 1990, he married Ludmila née Eliáš, who is relative to the general Alois Eliáš, who served as Prime Minister of the Protectorate of Bohemia and Moravia from April 27, 1939 to September 28, 1941. Bedřich Pola has 4 children: Kristina (1990), Martin (1992), Tomáš (1993), Markéta (1997). In 2010, he became the owner of castle in Bukovec.

Career 
In 1990, he founded the first private integrated circuit Development Centre in the Czech and Slovak Federative Republic ASIX s.r.o. In 2015 he became the President of Maltézská pomoc, o.p.s. (the humanitarian organization established by the SMOM's Grand Priory of Bohemia).

Honours and awards
: Knight of Honour and Devotion of the Sovereign Military Order of Malta

Notes 
Regarding personal names: Hrabě is a title, translated as Count, not a first or middle name. The female form is Hraběnka.

Bibliography

References

External links 
http://www.turistika.cz/mista/zamek-bukovec
http://www.asix.cz/index_about_history.htm

1963 births
Czech businesspeople
Living people
Charles University alumni
Knights of Malta